Diadegma carolina is a wasp first described by G.S. Walley in 1967.
No subspecies are listed.

References

carolina
Insects described in 1967